Many sporting mascots used as mascots and characters by clubs and teams in Australia and New Zealand are similar to those used around the world. There are, however, quite a number that are unique to these two nations.

The following is a list of notable mascots and characters created specifically for advertising purposes in Australia and New Zealand, listed alphabetically by the club or team they represent.

Australian Football

Australian Football League

In 2003, the Australian Football League standardised the club mascots into the Mascot Manor theme.  Some, however, have since been replaced.
  - Claude "Curls" Crow 
  - Roy the Lion (Former: The Brisbane Bear 1987-96)
  - Captain Carlton
  - Jock "One Eye" McPie
  - Moz "Skeeta" Reynolds
  - Johnny "The Doc" Docker (formerly Grinder)
  - Half Cat 
  - Sunny Ray (originally Gary "GC" Clifford)
  - G-man
  - Hudson "Hawka" Knights
  - Checker, Chuck and Cheeky (formerly Ronald "Dee" Mann)
  - Barry "Bruiser" Cracker
  - Tommy "Thunda" Power
  - Tiger "Stripes" Dyer (formerly Tiggy)
  - Trevor "Saint" Kilda
  - Syd "Swannie" Skilton
  - Rick "The Rock" Eagle
  - Woofer "Dogg" Whitten

Cricket

Big Bash League
 Adelaide Strikers - Smash and Summer
 Brisbane Heat - Heater
 Hobart Hurricanes - Captain hurricane
 Melbourne Renegades - Sledge (Cricketer from the year 2020) and Willow
 Melbourne Stars - Starman and starlett
 Perth Scorchers - Blaze and Amber
 Sydney Sixers - Syd 
 Sydney Thunder - Thor

State teams
 Victoria Bushrangers - Ned Ranger
 Queensland Bulls - "Rocky" the Five Star Senepol bull

Gridiron

Rugby League

National Rugby League
Brisbane Broncos - "Buck"
Canterbury Bulldogs - "Brutus"
Canberra Raiders - "Victor" the Viking
Cronulla Sharks - "Reefy" & "Hammerhead"
Gold Coast Titans - "Blade"
Manly-Warringah Sea Eagles - "Egor" the Eagle
Melbourne Storm - "Boom" and “Storm man”
Newcastle Knights - "Knytro" and “Novo”
New Zealand Warriors - "Tiki"
North Queensland Cowboys - "Bluey" the Cattledog
Parramatta Eels - "Sparky”,”Sparkles” and “Eric” the Eel
Penrith Panthers - "Claws" the Panther
St George Illawarra Dragons - "Scorch"
South Sydney Rabbitohs - "Rocket" the Bunny & Reggie the Rabbit"
Sydney Roosters - "Rocky" the Rooster
Wests Tigers - "Timmy" & "Stripes"

Rugby Union

Super Rugby
Western Force - Westy
Brumbies - Brumby Jack
Waratahs - Tah Man

National Rugby Championship

Soccer

A League
Adelaide United - "Red" the Kangaroo
Brisbane Roar - "Roary" the Lion & "Rosie" the Lion
Central Coast Mariners - "Marvin", "BBQ Sauce" & "Tomato Sauce" (formerly "Captain Yellowbeard" & "Admiral Frederick")
Gold Coast United - "GC"
Melbourne Heart - "Ticker"
Melbourne Victory - "Vic"
Newcastle Jets - "Benny"
Perth Glory - "George the Glory Gorilla"
Sydney FC - "Skye" & "Blue"
Wellington Phoenix - "Nixie"

Baseball

Australian Baseball League

Basketball

National Basketball League
Current Mascots
Adelaide 36ers - "Murray" the Magpie
Cairns Taipans - "Joe Blake"
Melbourne United - "Mr Baller"
New Zealand Breakers - "Cheeky" the Kea
Perth Wildcats - "Wilbur" the Wildcat
Sydney Kings - "The Lion"
South East Melbourne Phoenix - "Birdman" follow on Instagram
Tasmania JackJumpers - "Jack"
Illawarra Hawks - "Tomma" & "Moe"
Brisbane Bullets - "Boom"
Former Mascots
Gold Coast Blaze - "Burnie Blaze"
Melbourne Tigers - "Tigerman"
Townsville Crocodiles - "100% Croc"
Brisbane Bullets - "Mushroom"

Women's National Basketball League
Perth Lynx - "Layla" the Lynx
University of Canberra Capitals - "Cappie" the Giraffe

Other

Commonwealth Games
Borobi (mascot)
Karak (mascot)
Matilda (mascot)

See also
 List of Australian and New Zealand advertising characters
 List of sports team names and mascots derived from indigenous peoples

References

Mascots
Sports mascots
Mascots
Australian
Association football culture
Australian rules football culture
Rugby football culture
Australian mascots